Naga Hills Sign Language was a village sign language of India. Early in the 20th century, a high incidence of deafness was observed among communities of the Naga hills. A sign language was used by both deaf and hearing members of the community. 

Ethnologist and political officer John Henry Hutton wrote:

References

Village sign languages
Sign languages of India
Extinct languages of Asia
Extinct sign languages